Damrong Puttan (born May 31, 1944, in Phra Nakhon Si Ayutthaya –) is a Thai television host, radio presenter, a publisher of popular bi-weekly magazine, and senator.

Damrong is widely known as the host of several television programs for decades in the Thai mass communication industry.

Early life
Born and raised in a Muslim family in Ayutthaya. His ancestors migrated from Persia to Ayutthaya during the reign of King Ekathotsarot, about 400 years ago. As a child, he enjoyed swimming in the rivers of his hometown, including Chao Phraya, Pa Sak and Lop Buri. Also he enjoyed talking to western tourists visiting Ayutthaya in order to practice English by himself.

Careers
Damrong is considered one of the pioneering TV presenters in Thailand by starting since 1967, he is known for being an MC with late Thammarat Naksuriya. Prior to that, he worked as a catering department supervisor for Thai Airways Company (now Thai Airways International).

He is also the owner and editor of Khu Sang Khu Som (คู่สร้างคู่สม, "perfect couple"), a bi-weekly magazine featuring topics, such as family life, unrequited love story and overseas tourism, which was once the highest selling magazine in the country. The first issue was released in 1980 and closed down in 2017, total for a period of 38 years, 1,005 issues.

He is also known for hosting a program Johjai (เจาะใจ, "straight to the heart"), a variety talk show on Channel 5 every Thursday evening with Sanya Kunakorn from 1991 until 1999.

Politically, he had been elected as Bangkok senator from the first senate election in Thailand in 2000 according to the provisions of the 1997 Constitution.

Personal life

His younger brother Manoch Puttan is a famous rock musician and music critic.

References

1944 births
Living people
Damrong Puttan
Damrong Puttan
Damrong Puttan
Thai television personalities
Damrong Puttan
Damrong Puttan
Damrong Puttan
Damrong Puttan
Businesspeople in tourism